Disquiet is the fourteenth studio album by the rock band Therapy?, and the first album to be released on new UK label Amazing Record Co. Produced by Tom Dalgety, it was released on 23 March 2015.

Background 
Demo sessions for the album began at Blast Studios, Newcastle, England on 18 February 2014. The band laid down 18 tracks and completed pre-production on 28 February 2014. The album proper was recorded from 17 to 30 April 2014 at Blast Studios. The albums' release was delayed by almost a year due to their record company Blast Records shutting down and the band then signing with fledgling Amazing Record Co.

Pre-orders of the album were announced on 23 February 2015 and included an instant download of two album tracks and an exclusive pre-order track called We Kill People. A digital only single called Still Hurts, featuring two more non-album tracks, was released on 9 March 2015. A promo video directed by Sitcom Soldiers was premiered on 3 March 2015.

Disquiet reached No. 79 in the UK Charts which was the bands' highest chart placing since 1999's Suicide Pact – You First. The album was originally released on CD and download but the LP version was delayed release until 1 June 2015.

Disquiet - Restless Edition was released on CD on 20 May 2022 by Demolition Records. It featured the original album with 7 bonus tracks.

Early performances 
The opening track Still Hurts was debuted live at a gig in Cork on 25 October 2013 and played numerous times over the following months. Insecurity was first played live at the Coastrock Festival in Belgium on 12 April 2014. An acoustic version of Tides was debuted live by Andy Cairns at his gig in Helsinki on 13 February 2014, while an acoustic interpretation of Idiot Cousin was first aired at his Dublin show on 26 March 2014.

Track listing 
All songs written by Andrew James Cairns, except "Vulgar Display of Powder" and "Words Fail Me" written by Andrew James Cairns / Michael McKeegan / Neil Cooper.

Singles 
"Still Hurts" released 9 March 2015 as a digital only single with "Demons! Demons!" and "Armed with Anger".
"Deathstimate" released 30 October 2015 as a digital only single with "If You're Driving Pull Over" and "Electricity", a cover of the OMD track.
"Tides" released 15 April 2016 as a CD single with "Slippies", "Smile or Die" and "Insecurity (PitchPhase Mix)".

Promo videos 
"Still Hurts": directed by 'Sitcom Soldiers'
"Deathstimate": directed by 'Sitcom Soldiers'
"Tides": directed by 'Quantum VR Media'

Personnel 
Therapy?
Andy Cairns – vocals, guitar, producer
Neil Cooper – drums, producer
Michael McKeegan – bass, vocals, producer
Technical
Tom Dalgety – producer, engineer, mixer
Nigel Rolfe – artwork concept/photography

Charts

References

External links 
 

2015 albums
Therapy? albums
Albums produced by Tom Dalgety